XHAJ-FM is a radio station on 88.9 FM in Saltillo, Coahuila, Mexico. The station is owned by Compañía Periodística Criterios, S.A. de C.V., owner of the El Diario de Coahuila newspaper, and carries its talk format known as La Primera.

History
XEAJ-AM 1330 came to air on July 16, 1962. It was owned by Carlos G. Cirilo Treviño and soon sold to Radio Bonita, S.A., but from the start it was operated by the Jaubert family. Criterios bought XEAJ in 2000 and migrated it to FM in 2011.

References

Radio stations in Coahuila
Radio stations established in 1962
Mass media in Saltillo